Pedro Antonio Terán Mendoza (born July 24, 1996) is a Mexican footballer who currently plays for CAFESSA Jalisco, on loan from Atlas F.C.

Career
Born in Saltillo, Terán began playing youth football with Necaxa Saltillo. He joined Club Atlas, where he would be loaned to Venados F.C. twice. He made his professional debut with Venados in the Ascenso MX.

Terán played an important part in Mexico's participation at the 2013 FIFA U-17 World Cup. In December 2015 Terán joined Mérida club Venados F.C. on a six-month loan, a contract which was then extended.

Honours

International
Mexico U17
 CONCACAF U-17 Championship: 2013
 FIFA U-17 World Cup runner-up: 2013

References

Atlas F.C. footballers
1996 births
Living people
Sportspeople from Saltillo
Footballers from Coahuila
Mexico youth international footballers
Association football defenders
Mexican footballers
Venados F.C. players